Deborah Dale Shelton (born November 21, 1948) is an American actress, beauty queen, and songwriter who was Miss USA and appeared on Dallas for three seasons and a special guest return in 2013.

Pageants
In 1970, Shelton competed in the Miss Virginia USA pageant to spite her then boyfriend. She won the title and represented Virginia in the Miss USA 1970 pageant held in Miami, Florida in May 1970.

At the pageant, Shelton won the Miss Pixable award and was subsequently crowned Miss USA 1970. She was crowned by former titleholder Wendy Dascomb, also of Virginia; this was the first time that a state had won the Miss USA title back to back.

Shelton then went on to the Miss Universe contest in Miami, Florida in July where she placed first runner-up to Marisol Malaret of Puerto Rico.  She described competing at Miss Universe as "perhaps her greatest experience".

During her reign, Shelton traveled across the United States and internationally, including visits to Japan, Spain, Portugal, Brazil and Puerto Rico.

For winning Miss USA, she received $5,000 in cash, a $5,000 mink coat and made another $5,000 from personal appearances.

Education and career
Shelton was born in Washington, D.C. and grew up in Norfolk, Virginia. She graduated from Norview High School and attended Old Dominion University.  She was a junior studying art at the time she won the Miss USA title.

Prior to winning her first pageant title, Shelton was enrolled in a pre-medical [curriculum]. After college, she moved to New York City where she studied acting, modeled, and appeared on television commercials.

In March 1974, she appeared on the cover of Playboy Magazine. She starred in the feature film Blood Tide alongside legendary stage and screen actors José Ferrer and James Earl Jones. Filmed on location in the Greek islands, the 1982 film featured her singing a song during the end credits co-written with Shuki Levy, her second husband. She later starred in the 1984 film Body Double although her dialogue was dubbed by actress Helen Shaver because the director, Brian de Palma didn't like how she sounded when he was editing the film. Shelton made frequent guest appearances on television series such as Fantasy Island, The A-Team, T. J. Hooker, The Fall Guy, Cheers, The Love Boat, Riptide, and Get a Life. In 2008, she was cast to play a rich housewife in the American television series Nip/Tuck.

Shelton is widely known for her television role as Mandy Winger, one of J. R. Ewing's mistresses on Dallas. After the character left the show, an outpouring of fan mail convinced the producers to bring the character back. Shelton appeared in the series from 1984 to 1987. She also had a role on The Yellow Rose, a "critically acclaimed flop".

In 1991 and 1992, Shelton returned to the Miss USA stage, offering commentary during the pageant.

During 2012, Shelton made a guest appearance on the newly revived Dallas - she portrayed her old character Mandy Winger for J.R. Ewing's memorial service.

Personal life
Shelton married Vici Castro, a Cuban exile in 1971, less than a month after passing-on the Miss USA title. The couple had a son, Christopher, but the marriage ended within five years.  In 1977 she married Shuki Levy, a Jewish Israeli music producer, and they later had a daughter, Tamara. Shelton collaborated on his music.  One of their songs "Magdelena" appeared on a Julio Iglesias album.  She has since divorced her second husband.

References

External links
 
 
 
 Miss USA official website 
 The Playboy Index--List of Centerfolds and Cover Models

1948 births
Actors from Norfolk, Virginia
American film actresses
American television actresses
Living people
Miss Photogenic at Miss USA
Miss Universe 1970 contestants
Miss USA winners
Old Dominion University alumni
People from Washington, D.C.
21st-century American women